This is a List of clubs in the German Football League, including all clubs who played in the league while its official name was American football Bundesliga.

The American football Bundesliga was formed in 1979, consisting of six clubs. It was renamed to German Football League in 1999. From its inaugural season to the end of the 2015 season, 71 different clubs have played in the league, with the Frankfurt Universe becoming the 72nd team to enter the league in 2016. Of these clubs, the Munich Cowboys have spent the most seasons in the league, 35 of a possible 38 as of 2016, followed by the Berlin Adler with 34, both clubs being founding members of the league. The record number of championships, the German Bowl, have been won by the New Yorker Lions, formerly the Braunschweig Lions, with eleven wins. The Lions are also the record holder in division championships, with twelve, while the Berlin Adler hold the record for play-off participations with 24.

Overview
The league was formed with six club in 1979, with the top two teams after the regular season contesting the German Bowl. From 1980, onwards the league was always split into a northern and southern division. From 1986 to 1990 these two divisions were further subdivided, resulting in a four division format. Since 1991, it has been playing as a two division league again, north and south.

The German champions have been, from the inaugural season, determined in the German Bowl. From 1981, onwards play-offs were held to determine the two teams playing in the German Bowl. In 1981, the play-offs consisted of four teams, from 1982 onwards of eight. From 1986 to 1990 twelve teams qualified for the play-offs, with the four division champions receiving a bye for the first round. Since 1991, the format has returned to eight teams. The play-off contenders are evenly spread over each division, meaning, in the current two division format the best four teams in each division qualify.

List of clubs

The list of clubs in the league from its inception in 1979 to the present season, sorted by the last season a club played in the league:

Key

 1 Played as Braunschweig Lions from 1987 to 2010, as Hygia Lions in 2011 and as New Yorker Lions since 2012.
 2 Played as Kempten Comets from 1982 to 1993 and as Allgäu Comets since 1994.
 3 Played as Rothenburg Knights from 1984 to 1994 and as Franken Knights since 1995.
 4 Played as Nürnberg Rams from 1981 to 1997 and, again, since 2007. Played as Noris Rams from 1988 to 1998.
 5 Played as Rüsselsheim Razorbacks from 1989 to 2002 and, again, from 2007 to 2010 and as Rhein Main Razorbacks from 2003 to 2006.
 6 Played as Hilden Hurricanes from 1983 to 1989 and as Solingen Hurricanes from 1990 to 1998.
 7 Played as Bonner Jets from 1982 to 1989 and as Troisdorf Jets since 1990.
 8 Played as Augsburg Ants from 1986 to 1987 and as Königsbrunn Ants since 1988.

Season placings
The placings in the league from its inaugural season in 1979 to the present one:

Bundesliga
The Bundesliga era from 1979 to 1998:

Single division
Six clubs competed in the inaugural 1979 season with the Frankfurter Löwen winning the league and the German Bowl. Runners-up in both were the Ansbach Grizzlies while the Berlin Bären, now the Berlin Adler came third and the Bremerhaven Seahawks, Munich Cowboys and Düsseldorf Panther followed behind in this order.

North

South

GFL
The German Football League era from 1999 to present:

North

South

Key

 In 1979 the league was placed in a single division format with six clubs.
 League table for the 1980 season not available.
 From 1986 to 1990 the northern and southern divisions were subdivided into two divisions.

References

External links
  German Football League official website
  German American Football Association website
  Football History Historic American football tables from Germany
  Football Aktuell American football news, results & tables

Clubs
!
American football in Germany